Carol Owens may refer to:
 Carol Owens (squash player) (born 1971), New Zealand-based squash player
 Carol Owens (politician) (born 1931), Wisconsin legislator and dairy farmer
 Carol Owens, songwriter, see Jimmy and Carol Owens